Vice Admiral Glen Syndercombe  (17 November 1931 – 18 July 2005) was a former Chief of the South African Navy.

Born in Cape Town, Syndercomb attended school in Sea Point.  His nautical career began in January 1948 with a two-year cadetship at the SA Nautical College General Botha.

Early career
His seagoing career began in the British merchant service in 1950 as a cadet, and his first command came 10 years later in South Africa's Department of Sea Fisheries when he was appointed master of the fisheries survey vessel, Sardinops.

In 1959 he managed to fit in a course of studies at the University of Southampton before transferring from the merchant service to the SA Navy in 1960 as a junior officer.

Naval career
 Joined S.A.Navy as lieutenant in 1960.
 19631964 Long ND course, .
 19661969 Officer in Charge SAN Radar School in Durban.
 19691972 Project officer. Promoted to commander.

In October 1972 he became commanding officer of the destroyer  for two years before being appointed Senior Staff Officer Operations on the staff of the Commander of Naval Operations. This was followed by a one-year stint as a project officer for the Strike Craft project and then as commanding officer of the newly formed strike craft squadron from June 1976, in the rank of captain.
In 1979 he completed the Special Joint Staff Course at the South African Defence College and in January 1980 was appointed Director of Naval Operations and promoted to Commodore In October 1982 he became a rear admiral and Chief of Naval Staff Operations.

In 1985 he was promoted to vice admiral and appointed Chief of the S.A. Navy.

Honours and awards

The following were awarded:
  
 
 
 
 
 
 
 
 
 
  Grand Star of Military Merit (Chile)
 Chile 1980Star of Military Merit

References

See also 
 List of South African military chiefs

South African admirals
South African people of British descent
White South African people
2005 deaths
1931 births
People from Cape Town
Chiefs of the South African Navy